JCB may refer to:

 JCB (company), a British manufacturer of heavy industrial and agricultural vehicles
 JCB Co., Ltd., originally Japan Credit Bureau, a credit card company based in Tokyo, Japan
 JCB Prize, a literary award sponsored by the company JCB
 "JCB" (song), a 2005 song by Nizlopi featuring a JCB excavator
 Journal of Cell Biology, a weekly biology journal published by the Rockefeller University Press
 Journal of Crustacean Biology, a quarterly biology journal specialising in carcinology
 Juris Canonici Baccalaureus, Bachelor of Canon law degree
 University of Toronto Joint Centre for Bioethics, a research center
 Jimmy Carl Black, American musician